René Hanák (born 4 May 1973) is a Czech former professional tennis player.

Hanák was a Junior Davis Cup (World Youth Cup) representative for Czechoslovakia and began competing on the professional tour in the 1990s. Reaching a best singles world ranking of 349, he made two main draw appearances on the ATP Tour during his career, at the 1990 Prague Open and the 1997 Czech Indoor.

References

External links
 
 

1973 births
Living people
Czech male tennis players
Czechoslovak male tennis players